Henry Widdrington may refer to:

 Henry Widdrington (died 1623), English politician, Member of Parliament for Northumberland
 Henry Widdrington (died 1665), English politician, Member of Parliament for Morpeth